Heliekou Station, is a metro station of Line 2 and Line 4 of Wuxi Metro. It started operations on 28 December 2014.

Station Layout

Exits
There are 9 exits for this station.

Gallery

References

Railway stations in Jiangsu
Wuxi Metro stations
Railway stations in China opened in 2014